Daignault is a surname. Notable people with the surname include:

Cynthia Daignault (born 1978), American painter
Eugène Daignault (1895–1960), American-Canadian radio actor
Guy Daignault (died 2005), Canadian speed skater
Laurent Daignault (born 1968), Canadian speed skater
Michel Daignault (born 1966), Canadian speed skater